Mugeni is a commune in Harghita County, Romania. It lies in the Székely Land, an ethno-cultural region in eastern Transylvania.

Component villages 

The commune is composed of eight villages:

In 2004, the villages of Porumbenii Mari and Porumbenii Mici formed the commune of Porumbeni (Nagygalambfalva). The village of Betești (Betfalva) was transferred to the town of Cristuru Secuiesc that year.

History 
The villages forming the present-day commune were part of the Székely Land region of the historical Transylvania province. They belonged to Csíkszék district until the administrative reform of Transylvania in 1876, when they fell within the Csík County in the Kingdom of Hungary. After the Treaty of Trianon of 1920, they became part of Romania and fell within Ciuc County during the interwar period. In 1940, the second Vienna Award granted Northern Transylvania to Hungary and the villages were held by Hungary until 1944. After Soviet occupation, the Romanian administration returned and the commune became officially part of Romania in 1947. Between 1952 and 1960, the commune fell within the Magyar Autonomous Region, between 1960 and 1968 the Mureș-Magyar Autonomous Region. In 1968, the province was abolished, and since then, the commune has been part of Harghita County.

Demographics
The commune has an absolute Hungarian (Székely) majority. According to the 2002 census it has a population of 5,869 of which 98.82% or 5,800 are Hungarian.

Notable people 
Imre Palló (1891–1978), leading baritone at the Budapest State Opera 
Lajos Gidófalvy (1901–1945), military officer, antifascist activist
János Kardalus (1935–2006), ethnographer

Gallery

References

External links
Bögöz Church pictures by András Szász
Roman Catholic Parish

Communes in Harghita County
Localities in Transylvania
Székely communities